Big Yirkie Lake is a small lake in eastern Ontario, Canada. It can be found off of Highway 28, between Bancroft and Denbigh.  The shape of the lake is triangular and long. Although it is a small lake, it has two islands, and it is bigger than its counterpart, Little Yirkie Lake. People fish in the lake for Pike, Bass, Pickerel and Perch.

References

Lakes of Lennox and Addington County